Marko Raat (born 1 July 1973 in Tallinn) is an Estonian film director, scenarist and operator.

Filmography

 2002 "Agent Wild Duck" (feature film; director)
 2007 "Nuga" (feature film; director and scenarist)
 2010 "Lumekuninganna" (feature film; director and scenarist)	
 2015 "Fast Eddy vanad uudised" (documental film; director and scenarist)	
 2018 "Köögis" (documental film; director)
 2019 "Matusepäevikud" (documental film; director)

References

Living people
1973 births
Estonian film directors
Estonian screenwriters
People from Tallinn